William A. Wheeler (1819–1887) was the 19th vice president of the United States.

William, Billy, or Will Wheeler may also refer to:
William Adolphus Wheeler (1833–1874), United States lexicographer
William F. Wheeler (1824–1894), third U.S. Marshal for the Montana Territory
William G. Wheeler (1861–1936), American legislator and lawyer
William Wheeler (bishop) (1910–1998), British Roman Catholic Bishop of Leeds
William McDonald Wheeler (1915–1989), American politician from Georgia
William Morton Wheeler (1865–1937), American entomologist who studied ants
William Wheeler (Wisconsin politician) (1814–1881), American territorial legislator
Billy Edd Wheeler (born 1932), American songwriter and performer
William Wheeler (engineer) (1851–1932), president of Sapporo Agricultural College in Japan (now Hokkaido University), from 1877 to 1879
William Wheeler (cricketer), New Zealand cricketer
William V. Wheeler (1845–1908), founder of Wheeler Mission Ministries of Indianapolis, Indiana
William E. Wheeler (1843–1911), American businessman and politician from New York
William W. Wheeler, United States Navy admiral
Will Wheeler (born 1974), politician

See also
William Wheler (c.1611–1666), British Member of Parliament from 1640 to 1660